G.S. Megas Alexandros Thessaloniki (Greek: Γ.Σ. Μέγας Αλέξανδρος) is a multi-sport club that is located in the district of Dépôt, in the city of Thessaloniki, Greece. The club's full name is Gymnastikos Syllogos Megas Alexandros (Γυμναστικός Σύλλογος Μέγας Αλέξανδρος). It retains sporting departments in basketball, fencing, football, volleyball, and olympic weightlifting. The club's colours are red and black, and its emblem is an image of Alexander the Great.

History
The multi-sport club of G.S. Megas Alexandros Thessaloniki was founded in 1923. The club's men's football team participated in the Panhellenic Championships of 1932–33, 1933–34, and 1934–35. In those seasons, it failed to win any titles.The basketball and volleyball divisions of the club became its primary focuses in the ensuing decades, particularly their respective sports academies.

External links

history
academies
basketball departments 
football
volleyball

1923 establishments in Greece
Association football clubs established in 1923
Football clubs in Central Macedonia
Multi-sport clubs in Thessaloniki